Gunther Emmerlich (born 18 September 1944) is a German opera singer (bass) and show presenter.  He is also committed and proficient as a jazz performer and as a player of the banjo.

Life
Gunther Emmerlich was born during the final year of the war, from which his father never returned, in Eisenberg, a small town between Erfurt and Leipzig.   His mother died at the age of just 49 when he was eleven.   In medical terms, the cause of her death was multiple sclerosis, although Emmerlich believes that an underlying cause was continuing grief, following the death of her husband.   He was spared the orphanage thanks to his elder brother and sister, with whom he remained following his mother's death.

After successful completion of his school career he moved on to study civil engineering (demolition) at Erfurt.   On ending this training he switched to music, between 1967 and 1972 studying to be an opera singer at the Franz Liszt Academy in Weimar.   Between 1972 and 1992 he was a permanent member of the Dresden State Opera Company.   A particular showpiece role was that of Osmin in Seraglio.   He starred in a celebrated performance at Leipzig of Axion Esti, conducted by the composer, Mikis Theodorakis.  Other favourite roles included Falstaff in The Merry Wives of Windsor, Sarastro in Magic Flute, Milkman Tevye in Fiddler on the Roof, Eliza's father in My Fair Lady and Sallah Shabati in the musical of the same name by Ephraim Kishon.

During the 1980s in the German Democratic Republic Emmerlich embarked on a parallel career as a television presenter.   Between 1987 and 1990 he hosted the television cabaret show  Showkolade.   Following reunification, for many years Emmerlich was the presenter of Zauberhafte Heimat ("Homeland charms"), a popular show transmitted from Leipzig, featuring popular music.  This and other regular appearances have made him a firm favourite with television audiences across both sides of the pre-1990 internal border.

Since 2004 he has hosted the Folk Music Prizes gala ("Krone der Volksmusik").  From its revival in 2006 till 2015, Emmerlich hosted the Dresden Opera Ball.   He is a member of the "Semper House Band" which takes most of its members from the orchestra of the Dresden State Opera, and is dedicated to performing jazz.

Personal
He is married to the actress Anne-Kathrein Emmerlich (born Anne-Kathrein Kretschmar): the marriage has produced two recorded children.   It was reported in 2014 that the two had separated.   Gunther Emmerlich also has a son from an earlier relationship.

Awards and honours
 1990 Bambi Award
 1997 Order of Merit of the Federal Republic of Germany

References

People from Stadtroda
Musicians from Thuringia
German operatic basses
East German musicians
20th-century German musicians
German television presenters
Recipients of the Cross of the Order of Merit of the Federal Republic of Germany
1944 births
Living people
20th-century German male musicians